Milan Petrovic Quartet was formed in April 2011, and its first concert was in Belgrade, in hall Parobrod, 12.05.2011. Its second album Favorites was released in September 2013. Today, MPQ plays instrumental music with funk, blues, swing, jazz elements. MP Quartet is one of the most active bands in Serbian jazz/blues scene.

Members 

 Milan Petrović – keyboards
 Dimitrije Mojsijević – drums
 Lehel Nagy – saxophone
 Robert Gostinčar – bass guitar, double bass

Discography

Albums

Emotions 
Album released 2018.  Metropolis Music.
 Aero
 Blue as the sky & sea
 Friday the 13th
 Bubbles
 Robbo walk 
 Another way
 Deja vu
 Rain chant
 Kontraverzny bussinesman
 Stuck in the elevator

Dates 
Album released 2016.  Metropolis Music.
 14.01.2012.
 17.01.2014.
 27.12.2012.
 19.01.2012.
 10.06.2011.
 19.09.2013.
 12.01.2014.
 30.05.2012.
 22.07.2014.
 20.05.2013.

Live @ Nišville Jazz festival 2014. 
Album released 2015.

High Voltage Studio Sessions Vol.2 Milan Petrović Quartet Live 
Album released 2014.

Favorites 
Album released 2013.

Excursion 
Album released 2012. SKCNS
 Amsterdam Central Station (ft Dušan Bezuha) 
 Orient express(ft Wikluh Sky & Blue Family)
 Jam in Rome (ft Pace, Darko & Duda)
 Autumn in London (ft Vasil Hadžimanov & Aca Seltic)
 Cool swing from Pancevo (ft Ivan Aleksijević & Blue Family)
 Belgrade funky time (studio session) (ft Paja)
 Travelling by Mississippi (ft Zafa)
 Santorini view (ft Dušan Bezuha & Boris Bunjac)
 Nuits sous le Toir Eifell (ft Ana Stanić & Dušan Bezuha)
 Memphis blue nights (ft Raw Hide)
 Afroman in New York (ft Alberto So Sabi & Dušan Bezuha)
 Talking about blues & Cuba (ft Vladimir Maričić)

External links
Official Site
Album reviews
tportal.hr
timemachinemusic.org
blic.rs

Serbian jazz ensembles
Jazz
Serbian jazz
Serbian music